Konstantin Rudnev (1911–1980) was a Soviet politician who held various cabinet and public posts. He was the long-term minister of instrument making, automated equipment, and control systems between 1965 and 1980. He played a significant role in the Soviet missile and space programs.

Early life and education
Rudnev was born in Tula on 22 June 1911. He graduated from Tula Mechanics Institute in 1935.

Career
In 1940 Rudnev joined the Communist Party. During World War II he served as the director of a munitions plant. On 8 August 1950 he was named as the head of a science and research institute, NII 88, replacing Major General Lev R. Gonor in the post. In May 1952 Rudnev was appointed deputy minister of armaments under Dmitry Ustinov. The Ministry of Defense was renamed as the State Committee for Defense Technology in May 1958, and Rudnev was named as its chairman. 

In 1961 Rudnev became a member of the central committee of the Communist Party. In June 1961 he was appointed deputy premier responsible for research activities which he held until October 1965. Next he was appointed minister of instrument making, automated equipment, and control systems in October 1965. He held the post until his death in August 1980.

Death
Rudnev died in Moscow on 13 August 1980 while serving as the minister. He was buried in the Novodevichy cemetery.

Awards
Rudnev was awarded the Order of Lenin on 17 June 1961. He was also named as the Hero of Socialist Labour.

References

External links

1911 births
1980 deaths
Central Committee of the Communist Party of the Soviet Union members
People's commissars and ministers of the Soviet Union
Soviet Ministers of Defence
People from Tula, Russia
Burials at Novodevichy Cemetery
Lenin Prize winners
Heroes of Socialist Labour